Laharpur is one of the 403 constituencies of the Uttar Pradesh Legislative Assembly,  India. It is a part of the Sitapur district and one of the five assembly constituencies in the Sitapur Lok Sabha constituency. The first election in this assembly constituency was held in 1957 after the "DPACO (1956)" (delimitation order) was passed in 1956. After the Delimitation of Parliamentary and Assembly Constituencies Order was passed in 2008, the constituency was assigned identification number 148.

Wards  / Areas
Laharpur Assembly constituency consists of the KCs Tambaur, Laharpur, Parsendi, PCs Mador, Bohara, Sumrawan & Patrasa of Marsanda KC, Laharpur MB &  Tambaur-Ahamadabad NP of Laharpur Tehsil.

Members of the Legislative Assembly

Election Results

2022

2012

See also

Sitapur district
Sitapur Lok Sabha constituency
Sixteenth Legislative Assembly of Uttar Pradesh
Uttar Pradesh Legislative Assembly
Vidhan Bhawan

References

External links
 

Assembly constituencies of Uttar Pradesh
Politics of Sitapur district